Eichelbach may refer to:
 Eichelbach (Baunach), a river of Bavaria, Germany, tributary of the Baunach
 Eichelbach (Nidda), a river of Hesse, Germany, tributary of the Nidda
 Eichelbach (Weil), a river of Hesse, Germany, tributary of the Weil